is a 2020 Japanese live-action film based on the manga series Kaiji, written and illustrated by Nobuyuki Fukumoto. It is the final installment of a trilogy directed by Tōya Satō and premiered in Japan on January 10, 2020. Unlike the first two previous films, Kaiji and Kaiji 2, Kaiji: Final Game is not based on a specific part of the series and it is a completely original story written by Fukumoto.

Cast
Tatsuya Fujiwara as Kaiji Itō
Nagisa Sekimizu as Kanako Kirino
Mackenyu as Minato Hirose
Sota Fukushi as Kōsuke Takakura
Kōtarō Yoshida as Yoshihiro Kurosaki
Suzuki Matsuo as Tarō Ōtsuki
Yūki Amami as Rinko Endō
Katsuhisa Namase as Kōtarō Sakazaki
Ikusaburo Yamazaki as Keiji Nishino
Masatō Ibu as Shigeru Tōgō
Toshiki Seto as Taichi Sugawara
Mariko Shinoda as Last Judgement challenger
Akio Kaneda as Sōichirō Shibusawa
Gōki Maeda as Tsuyoshi Takase

Soundtrack
Yugo Kanno composed the music for the film. The original score was released on January 8, 2020.

Release
In May 2019, Kaiji: Final Game, the third and final film of Kaijis live-action trilogy. with a completely original story by Nobuyuki Fukumoto, was announced.

Kaiji: Final Game was theatrically released on January 10, 2020 in Japan.

The film premiered in Singapore on March 5, 2020. It was originally planned to premiere in Malaysia on March 19, 2020, but it was delayed due to the COVID-19 pandemic, and the film opened on July 1, 2020. The film was released in Indonesia on December 9, 2020.

Novelization
A novelization of the film written by Van Madoy was published by Kodansha on November 14, 2019.

Reception

Box office
During the opening weekend, Kaiji: Final Game ranked at #2 at the Japanese box office, earning ¥362 million ($3.29 million), and earned ¥616 million ($5.60 million) from January 10–13. The film stayed at #2 in its third weekend and earned an additional ¥198,153,400 ($1.81 million). The film dropped to #4 in its fourth weekend, and earned ¥120,022,950 ($1.10 million). The film dropped from #8 to #10 in its sixth weekend and earned ¥35,480,750 ($323,000).

By February 2020, Kaiji: Final Game had grossed ¥1,935,549,950 ($17.62 million). , it has grossed  in Japan, and $14,608 in Vietnam, for a total of $19,914,608 in Asia.

Critical reception
Marcus Goh of Yahoo! Style gave the film 3.5 out of 5. Goh commented that the film's start is strong, showing the dire straits that Kaiji has fallen into and considered it as a "mild political commentary on the labour market in Japan". He praised the first game showed in the film, the Tower of Babel, but stated that the rest of the games are "lacklustre in execution", and although he said that the variety of gambling challenges captures the spirit of the original manga series, the film imports some elements from the original work that "don't work so well with actual human actors". Goh concluded: "Kaiji: Final Game echoes the spirit of the manga and anime well by staying true to the elements that made it popular. It does hew a little too closely though, resulting in segments that look awkward when translated to a live-action movie. Nevertheless, fans will be pleased to see another Kaiji film on the big screen".

Tay Yek Keak of Today in his review of Kaiji: Final Game, considered it as "quite enjoyably fascinating and intellectually stimulating", due that in this third installment "the ambition has grown much bigger. National-size bigger, in fact." Keak mentioned that Fujiwara in his role as Kaiji looks exactly as he was in the first film, and that the only thing that shows that 11 years have passed since the first film is that the "main winner-takes-all game here is more sedentary and less energetic." Keak ultimately added that "it's protracted, it's filled with the outlandish clichés which Japanese flicks love to indulge in and it may seem like a juvenile plaything to the uninitiated. But I like the dark financial apocalypse proposed here which is quite grimly thrilling just to ponder on".

References

External links
 Official website 
 Nippon TV English official website
 

Films about death games
Films set in Japan
Films about gambling
2020s Japanese-language films
Kaiji (manga)
Live-action films based on manga
Toho films
Films directed by Tōya Satō